TrafFix Devices, Inc. v. Marketing Displays, Inc., 532 U.S. 23 (2001), was a United States Supreme Court decision in the area of trademark law, holding that a functional design could not be trademarked, and that a patented design was presumed to be functional.

Background
The plaintiff, Marketing Display, Inc., held patents on a two-spring design to keep traffic signs standing in strong winds. After the plaintiff's patents expired, the defendant, TrafFix Devices, Inc., began manufacturing their own signs using the design. The plaintiff sued for trade dress infringement based on copying of the recognizable design. The issue the Courts dealt with concerned the legal question of whether trade dress protection could apply to the subject of an expired patent.

Opinion of the Court
The Court, in a unanimous opinion by Justice Anthony Kennedy, held that there can be no trademark protection for something that is functional because that would work as a detriment to competitors based on something other than reputation, which is the key consideration in trademark law.

The Court noted that the plaintiff has the burden of proving that the characteristic for which protection is sought is not functional—but having a patent for a design raises a very strong presumption that the design was functional. A design is functional if it serves any purpose that makes the product work better, or makes the product less expensive to produce. That an alternative design is available does not undercut the functionality of a given design.Discussing trademarks, we have said “ ‘[i]n general terms, a product feature is functional,’ and cannot serve as a trademark, ‘if it is essential to the use or purpose of the article or if it affects the cost or quality of the article.’ ”. Expanding upon the meaning of this phrase, we have observed that a functional feature is one the “exclusive use of [which] would put competitors at a significant non-reputation-related disadvantage.” . . . Where the design is functional under the Inwood formulation there is no need to proceed further to consider if there is a competitive necessity for the feature. Here, Justice Kennedy said, the design was clearly functional, and the plaintiff could not carry the burden of proving otherwise because the very characteristic that is sought to be protected by trademark is the one whose functionality was previously sought to be covered by patent.

See also
 List of United States Supreme Court cases, volume 532
 List of United States Supreme Court cases

References

External links
 

2001 in United States case law
United States Supreme Court cases
United States Supreme Court cases of the Rehnquist Court
United States trademark case law